Stout Risius Ross, LLC. (Stout) is a global investment bank and advisory firm specializing in corporate finance, transaction advisory, valuation, financial disputes, claims, and investigations. The firm is headquartered in Chicago.

History

1991 - Craige Stout founds the firm in Detroit, providing valuation services to clients. Beginning with a two-person team in a living room, the Detroit office has grown to one of the largest in the firm.

1997 - Established its Investment Banking group, offering advice on mergers and acquisitions, private capital raising, and other services for business owners, private equity portfolio companies, and corporate divisions.

1998 - The Disputes, Compliance, & Investigations group launches, delivering a variety of services, including expert testimony, litigation consulting, investigations, compliance, and special assignments.

2000 - The firm opens up its Cleveland office. 

2001 - The Chicago office opens. The office has become the largest at the firm in terms of both personnel and revenue. 

2004 - The Tysons Corner office opens in Virginia, servicing the Washington, DC, metropolitan region
 
2007 - The firm expands its East Coast footprint with the opening of its New York office. Also, during the year, the firm relocates its headquarters to Chicago. 

2011 - The firm expands to the West Coast with the opening of its Los Angeles office.

2012 - The firm completes its first major acquisition with the purchase of valuation and investment banking firm Howard Frazier Barker Elliott (HFBE). Through this transaction, the firm establishes a Dallas and Houston office. Separately, the firm opens offices in Atlanta and Washington, DC, strengthening is East Coast base.

2014 - The firm opens offices in Baltimore and Denver. 

2016 - The firm celebrates its 25-year anniversary. It completes its acquisition of Natoma Partners, fortifying its Disputes, Compliance, & Investigations services. The firm also opens offices in Philadelphia, Grand Rapids, Michigan, and Irvine, California. 

2017 - The firm launches its new brand (Stout). The firm acquires FMV Opinions, further expanding its Valuation Advisory group. In addition, the firm opens its first office outside of the US in Lausanne, Switzerland. 

2018 - The firm expands its global footprint to Asia with offices in Shanghai, Singapore, and Hong Kong. 

2019 - The firm opens offices in Berlin, Milan, and San Francisco.

2020 - The London office is established with transaction coverage in the Nordic and Western European markets.

2021 - Stout celebrates its 30-year anniversary. Stout partners with Audax Private Equity, acquires Secura Risk Management, launches IT Due Diligence practice, and opens a Miami office.

2022 - Stout integrates five new firms: Methodical Valuation & Advisory, Genova Group, Davis & Hosfield, The Claro Group, and Vantage Point Advisors. The firm also opens new offices in Charlotte and San Diego.

References

 https://www.stout.com/en/about
 Stout Expands Investment Banking Operations with Office in London - https://www.prnewswire.com/news-releases/stout-expands-investment-banking-operations-with-office-in-london-300981787.html January 7, 2020
Stout Risius Ross Launches New Stout Brand - https://www.prnewswire.com/news-releases/stout-risius-ross-launches-new-stout-brand-300441014.html April 18, 2017
Stout Risius Ross to purchase FMV Opinions, Inc. - https://www.prnewswire.com/news-releases/stout-risius-ross-inc-to-purchase-fmv-opinions-inc-300402093.html February 3, 2017
Audax Private Equity Partners with Stout to Support Future Growth - https://www.prnewswire.com/news-releases/audax-private-equity-partners-with-stout-to-support-future-growth-301410528.html October 28, 2021

External links
 Global website

Investment banks in the United States
Financial services companies established in 1991
Banks established in 1991
Consulting firms established in 1991
1991 establishments in Illinois